The Roman Catholic Diocese of Baroda is a diocese located in the city of Baroda in the Ecclesiastical province of Gandhinagar in India.

History
 September 29, 1966: Established as the Diocese of Baroda from the Metropolitan Archdiocese of Bombay

Leadership
 Bishops of Baroda (Latin Rite)
 Bishop Godfrey de Rozario, S.J. (August 29, 1997 – December 18, 2021)
 Bishop Francis Leo Braganza, S.J. (April 27, 1987 – August 29, 1997)
 Bishop Ignatius Salvador D’Souza (September 29, 1966 – January 19, 1986)

References

External links
 Giga-Catholic Information 
 Catholic Hierarchy 

Roman Catholic dioceses in India
Christian organizations established in 1966
Roman Catholic dioceses and prelatures established in the 20th century
1966 establishments in Gujarat
Christianity in Gujarat
Vadodara